The Grêmio Recreativo e Esportivo Reunidas, also known as Vôlei Futuro, were a Brazilian women's volleyball team based in Araçatuba, São Paulo. Created from the men's team, women's section folded in July 2012, a few months after finishing third in the 2011–12 Brazilian Superliga.

2011–2012 team
As of June 2011

 Coach:  Paulo Rego Barros Junior (Paulo Coco)
 1st Assistant coach:  Jorge Edson Souza de Brito 
 2nd Assistant coach:  Glaison Luis Raimundo

Honors
 Champion - Jogos Abertos do Interior - Santos 2010
 2nd place - Campeonato Paulista 2010
 2nd place - Torneio Internacional da Basileia (Suiça) 2010
 3th place - Brazilian Superliga 2010/2011
 2nd place - Jogos Abertos do Interior - Mogi das Cruzes 2011
 Champion - Campeonato Paulista 2011

References
 Confederação Brasileira de Voleibol - Vôlei Futuro: Women Team

External links
Official website

Brazilian volleyball clubs
Volleyball clubs in São Paulo (state)
Sports teams in São Paulo